BBC Radio Leicester is the BBC's local radio station serving the counties of Leicestershire and Rutland.

It broadcasts on FM, DAB, digital TV and via BBC Sounds from studios at St Nicholas Place in Leicester.

According to RAJAR, the station had a weekly audience of 117,000 listeners and a 4.5% share as of December 2022.

History

BBC Radio Leicester was the first of the new wave of BBC Local Radio stations introduced in the 1960s. Radio Leicester began broadcasting at 12:45 on 8 November 1967 on 95.05 VHF from a transmitter located on Gorse Hill above the city centre.

The station's former 837 kHz medium wave frequency from the Freeman's Common transmitter, near the University of Leicester, is now used by the BBC Asian Network, which originated in Leicester but is now a national network delivered via DAB, digital satellite, Freeview and other systems across the UK and beyond.

In 2007, the station celebrated its 40th anniversary by launching a Ruby Rainbow Appeal in aid of the Rainbows Hospice based in Loughborough, within its TSA (total survey area). Special events took place throughout the year culminating in a final fundraising appeal around the time of the anniversary in November 2007.

Studios

In 2005, the station moved to new premises at 9 St Nicholas Place. This new centre is adjacent to the medieval Guildhall and Cathedral and includes many aspects of Leicester's history, such as Victorian tiles and an undercroft (first revealed in 1841), with remains dating to Roman times. The Centre houses the BBC College of Journalism's base for the Midlands, an IT Centre that is used in partnership with local organisations, and a BBC Shop selling a wide range of BBC-branded merchandise.

Transmitters

Although the station's FM transmitter mast is only 70 m (230 ft) tall, it is set 235 m (770 ft) above sea level on top of the Jurassic limestone ridge at Copt Oak, next to the M1. This is a high point in Charnwood Forest, part of the National Forest.

Since 6 December 2002, the station's DAB signal has come from the NOW Digital East Midlands (NDEM) Leicester 11B multiplex, which comes from the Copt Oak and Houghton on the Hill transmitters.

In addition, BBC Radio Leicester also broadcasts on Freeview TV channel 721 in the BBC East Midlands region and streams online via BBC Sounds.

Programming
Local programming is produced and broadcast from the BBC's Leicester studios from 6am – 10pm on Sundays – Fridays and from 6am – 6pm and 8-10pm on Saturdays.

Off-peak programming, including the late show from 10pm – 1am, originates from BBC Radio WM (Monday – Thursday) and BBC Radio Nottingham (Friday – Sunday).

During the station's downtime, BBC Radio Leicester simulcasts overnight programming from BBC Radio 5 Live and BBC Radio London.

References

External links
 BBC Radio Leicester
 The history of Radio Leicester
 Copt Oak transmitter (including coverage map)
 Houghton-on-the-Hill transmitter (digital)
 The old 837 kHz transmitter in Leicester

Audio clips
 Suspect dedication in 2006

Radio stations established in 1967
Leicester
Radio stations in Leicestershire